The Borgo Medioevale in Turin, Italy, is an open air museum and reconstructed medieval village and castle. It is located in the Parco del Valentino (Valentino Park) on the riverbank of the Po river. It was built for the 1884 Italian general exposition and it was constructed by replicating and mimicking late-medieval architecture of the Piedmont region. 

The reconstructed architecture, decorations, and landscaping followed strict criteria of faithfulness to historical models. Over 40 sites (including castles, villages, and churches) all across Piedmont and Aosta Valley were used as models and many intellectuals, historians, artists and technicians took part in the project. Among the structures that served as models are Fénis Castle, Issogne Castle, Verrès Castle, and Ivrea Castle.

Gallery

Further reading 
 Esposizione generale italiana. Catalogo ufficiale della sezione Storia dell'arte: guida illustrata al castello feudale del secolo XV, Tipografia di Vincenzo Bona, Torino, 1884, con una introduzione di Giuseppe Giacosa per conto della Commissione (copia digitalizzata sul sito MuseoTorino)

References 

Museums in Turin
Buildings and structures in Turin